The Pulaski County Courthouse is located at 405 West Markham Street in downtown Little Rock, Arkansas, the state capital and the county seat of Pulaski County.  It is set among a number of other state and city government buildings, on a city block bounded by West Markham, Spring, West 2nd, and South Broadway Streets, with a county park occupying the western portion of the block.  The courthouse has two portions: an elaborate Romanesque edifice built of stone and brick in 1887–89 to a design by Max A. Orlopp, and a large four-story Beaux Arts annex designed by George Mann and added in 1913–14.  The annex is acknowledged as one of Mann's most successful commissions.

The building was listed on the National Register of Historic Places in 1979.

See also
National Register of Historic Places listings in Little Rock, Arkansas

References

External links

Courthouses on the National Register of Historic Places in Arkansas
Romanesque Revival architecture in Arkansas
Beaux-Arts architecture in Arkansas
Government buildings completed in 1887
Buildings and structures in Little Rock, Arkansas
County courthouses in Arkansas
National Register of Historic Places in Little Rock, Arkansas